The Matra-Simca MS650 is a Group 6 prototype race car introduced in 1969 for the International Championship for Makes. The MS650 replaced the previous Matra-Simca MS630.

Racing History

1969
The car made its debut at the 1969 24 Hours of Le Mans with a four car entry. Jean-Pierre Beltoise/Piers Courage in the MS650, Jean Guichet/Nino Vaccarella in the MS630, Nanni Galli/Robin Widdows and Johnny Servoz-Gavin/Herbert Müller were both in the MS630/650. Beltoise/Courage finished fourth followed by Guichet/Vaccarella in fifth, Galli/Widdows seventh but Servoz-Gavin/Müller retired when an electrical circuit failed. For the 1969 6 Hours of Watkins Glen, Matra entered two cars for Servoz-Gavin/Pedro Rodriguez in the MS650 and Guichet/Widdows in the MS630/650. Servoz-Gavin/Rodriguez finished fourth and Guichet/Widdows retired with a broken clutch. For the final race of the 1969 season, the 1000km of Zeltweg, Matra only entered Servoz-Gavin/Rodriguez but the car retired through accident.

In the International Championship for Makes, Matra had scored six points, earning it fifth place in the championship.

1970
The first race of the season was the 1970 24 Hours of Daytona, Matra had two cars for Jack Brabham/François Cevert and Jean-Pierre Beltoise/Henri Pescarolo. Brabham/Cevert finished tenth and Beltoise/Pescarolo finished 18th. Matra made changes to the driver line ups for the 12 Hours of Sebring, Pescarolo/Servoz-Gavin and Cevert/Dan Gurney. Pescarolo/Servoz-Gavin finished fifth and Cevert/Gurney finish 12th. Matra again made changes to the driver line ups for the 1000km of Brands Hatch, The team put Brabham/Beltoise together but kept  Pescarolo/Servoz-Gavin. Brabham/Beltoise finish 12th and Pescarolo/Servoz-Gavin retired with engine failure. The MNZ saw Brabham/Beltoise fifth followed by Pescarolo/Servoz-Gavin in sixth. The team skipped the next three races, the Targa Florio, 1000km of Spa-Francorchamps and 1000km of Nürburgring. The team entered three cars for the 24 Hours of Le Mans Beltoise/Pescarolo in the new Matra-Simca MS660, Brabham/Cevert and Patrick Depailler/Jean-Pierre Jabouille/Tim Schenken were both in the MS650 but all three cars retired with engine failure. The team skipped the final two race of the 1970 season, the Watkins Glen 6 Hours and Austrian 1000km.

In the International Championship for Makes, Matra had scored four points, earning it fourth place in the championship.

Complete International Championship for Makes results

References 

Matra vehicles
Sports prototypes
24 Hours of Le Mans race cars
Mid-engined cars